Gurpreet "Guru" Singh (born March 21, 1980) is an American actor.

Singh was born in Houston, Texas, where his Indian parents immigrated from Punjab, India.  He was raised in Spring, Texas and went to Klein Forest High School. Later he graduated with a Bachelor of Arts in Acting from the University of Houston, where he also received a Bachelor of Business Administration in MIS. He currently resides in Los Angeles, California.

Filmography

Television

References

External links 

Living people
American male television actors
1980 births
University of Houston alumni
Male actors from Texas
People from Spring, Texas